The Son of Man is a nonfiction book by Indian author Andrew Harvey, published in 1998.

The book offers a model for "the authentic full-grown Christ-consciousness", which the author believes has been obscured for two millennia by a Christianity "full of weakness and mistakes and not a full-grown Christianity springing from the spirit of Jesus".

The Historical Christ

The first chapter is an historical introduction to this essentially mystical book, preparing for Harveys later chapters concentrating on mysticism, ecstatic visions and written in exalted language.

The author posits that many comforting myths have to be surrendered, along with the belief in the total veracity of the Gospels themselves. His human Son of Man turns out to be as infallible as the divine Son of God. As a result, this book is  inspiration for those who are mainly interested in the mystical aspects of Christ and can be commended for some inspiring interpretations of Jesus' original teachings.

Jesus as Evolved Mystic

According to Harvey 
What’s so important about the Christ that I discovered is that Jesus did not want to create a separate religion. Jesus did not believe that he was the unique son of God but was, rather, a very, very evolved mystic, who saw the possibilities for the total transformation of our world through an explosion of love consciousness. He was prepared not only to see it, like so many of our modern sages who talk about it, but actually to live it out in a most unnerving radical revolutionary challenging way. He challenged all the social lunacies of his and any other time, and was crucified for it—crucified by the religious and political establishment that his vision threatened.

Divine Feminine aspects

Harvey's book points out feminine aspects of Jesus, neglected by mainstream Christianity, according to him.

References

1998 non-fiction books
1998 in Christianity